Flat Fork or Flatfork may refer to:

Flat Fork, Kentucky, an unincorporated community
Flat Fork (Brown Creek tributary), a stream in Anson County, North Carolina
Flatfork, West Virginia, an unincorporated community
Flatfork fern, a type of fern